Saint Lucia competed at the 2014 Summer Youth Olympics, in Nanjing, China from 16 August to 28 August 2014.

Athletics

Saint Lucia qualified two athletes.

Qualification Legend: Q=Final A (medal); qB=Final B (non-medal); qC=Final C (non-medal); qD=Final D (non-medal); qE=Final E (non-medal)

Boys
Track & road events

Girls
Field events

Beach Volleyball

St. Lucia qualified a girls' team by winning the NORCECA ECVA Zone Qualifier.

Sailing

St. Lucia was given a boat to compete by the tripartite committee.

Swimming

Saint Lucia qualified one swimmer.

Girls

References

Saint Lucia at the Youth Olympics
You